Nathanael Ace Pineda Villanueva (born October 25, 1995) is a Filipino footballer who plays as a goalkeeper for Philippines Football League club Cebu.

Career
Villanueva played for the college team UP Fighting Maroons. He appeared for Meralco Manila and Kaya F.C.–Iloilo in the professional Philippines Football League.

On May 12, 2018, Villanueva was named man of the match for his performance in Kaya's 2–0 win over Ceres–Negros. He saved Bienvenido Marañón's penalty kick in the 20th minute, and was instrumental in ending Ceres' five-match winning streak. He joined Cebu F.C. in 2021.

Villanueva was named in the Philippines' squad for the 2018 Bangabandhu Cup and 2019 AFC Asian Cup, but is yet to earn a senior international cap.

References

External links
 
 Nathanael Villanueva at WorldFootball.com
 

1995 births
Living people
Filipino footballers
Association football goalkeepers
F.C. Meralco Manila players
Kaya F.C. players
2019 AFC Asian Cup players
Competitors at the 2017 Southeast Asian Games
Southeast Asian Games competitors for the Philippines
Cebu F.C. players